Dennis Andrew Ververgaert (born March 30, 1953) is a Canadian former professional ice hockey right winger who played in the National Hockey League from 1973 until 1981. He featured in the 1980 Stanley Cup Finals with the Flyers.

Ververgaert is best known for his time with the Vancouver Canucks, where he was one of the club's top players in their first decade of existence. He was selected to play in the NHL All-Star Game in 1976 and 1978.

Playing career
Ververgaert had a dominant junior career with the London Knights, scoring 147 points in 1972–73, including a franchise record 89 assists (surpassed by Sergei Kostitsyn in 2005–06), and was selected 3rd overall in the 1973 NHL Amateur Draft by the Vancouver Canucks. Blessed with size and skill together with a booming shot, Ververgaert was thought to have the potential to be the first true star player in the history of the young franchise.

In his first NHL season, Ververgaert did not disappoint, stepping straight into the Canucks' roster and recording a team-leading 26 goals along with 31 assists for 57 points. He led all rookies in goals and was second in points to Tom Lysiak, and finished fourth in Calder Memorial Trophy voting as the league's top rookie. His 26 goals remained the Canuck rookie record until broken by Trevor Linden in 1988–89.

In 1974–75 Ververgaert was even better, recording 51 points in 57 games despite missing substantial time due to a serious shoulder injury. His production was a key factor in the team's improvement, as they won their division and made the playoffs for the first time. He would have his finest season in 1975–76, leading the Canucks with 37 goals and 71 points. He was also selected to play in his first NHL All-Star Game and proceeded to score two goals in 10 seconds to set an All-Star record, since broken by Owen Nolan.

After the success of his first three seasons, Ververgaert appeared to be on the verge of stardom. However, his career would go sideways after 1976 as his production dropped off and he came under increased criticism for his poor defensive play. His greatest success had been with center André Boudrias, and after Boudrias left for the WHA, he was never able to find the same sort of chemistry with later linemates. In 1976–77, he slumped to 27 goals and just 45 points, while recording a dismal plus/minus rating of -35. He rebounded slightly in 1977–78 to tally 21 goals and a career-high 33 assists for 54 points, and was selected to play in his second All-Star game.

In 1978–79, he started the season slowly with just 9 goals in his first 35 games, and was facing stiff competition for icetime from star rookie Stan Smyl. Midway through the season, he was dealt to the Philadelphia Flyers for Kevin McCarthy and Drew Callander, and finished the year with career lows of 18 goals and 44 points. In Philadelphia, he was used more as a utility player instead of the front-line forward he was in Vancouver, and was occasionally a healthy scratch. He recorded 14 goals and 17 assists for 31 points in 58 games in 1979–80, but only appeared in two games as the Flyers reached the Stanley Cup finals.

Released by the Flyers, he signed with the Washington Capitals for 1980–81. He turned in a decent performance for the Capitals, finishing the year with 14 goals and 41 points in 79 games. However, at the start of the 1981–82 campaign he was assigned to the minors, and chose to retire rather than accept the assignment.

Ververgaert finished his career with totals of 176 goals and 216 assists for 392 points in 583 games, along with 247 penalty minutes. His 139 goals as a Vancouver Canuck uniform place him 11th all-time, and only Don Lever scored more goals for the club during the 1970s.

Following his career, Ververgaert returned to Vancouver where he operates an insurance business and is an active member of the Canucks' alumni organization.

Career statistics

External links
 
Profile at hockeydraftcentral.com

1953 births
Canadian ice hockey forwards
Canadian people of Dutch descent
Living people
London Knights players
National Hockey League All-Stars
National Hockey League first-round draft picks
New York Golden Blades draft picks
Philadelphia Flyers players
St. Catharines Black Hawks players
Vancouver Canucks draft picks
Vancouver Canucks players
Washington Capitals players
People from Grimsby, Ontario